Press Gang is a British children's television series.

Press Gang may also refer to:
Press gang or impressment, the practice of pressing men into military service
Press Gang (comics), a fictional group in the Marvel Comics universe
Press Gang Publishers, a Canadian book publishing company